Michael Ugwu is an investor and entrepreneur with experience in Nigeria's music and entertainment industry and was formerly the General Manager of Sony Music Entertainment, West Africa. He is the founder and CEO of Freeme Digital. Prior to this, Michael was the CEO of iROKING Ltd

Early life and education 
Michael was born in Withington Community Hospital, South Manchester to Michael Ugwu Snr., who, at the time, was in the Nigerian Federal House of Representatives representing Udi, Anambra State, and Charity Afoma Ugwu. Michael's formative years were spent in North West London where the family moved to soon after the birth of his younger brother Nicholas Uchenna Ugwu.

Michael received his primary and secondary education from Lockers Park Boarding School in Hertfordshire and Woodside Park International School, London. He obtained his Bachelor's Degree in Politics and History from Brunel University London in 2002 and went on to pursue in a Master's Degree in Economic Development at University College London (UCL), graduating in 2007. Michael also received Executive Education at Lagos Business School, Pan Atlantic University, and Harvard Business School in 2016 and 2017 respectively.

Career 
While working as a business analyst at the Royal Bank of Scotland Michael began actively planning to return to Nigeria in 2007. That year, he attended multiple careers fairs in London where African business were exhibiting and received a number of job offers from leading Nigerian financial services institutions including Diamond Bank, and Access Bank. Michael accepted an offer from Futureview Capital, a leading Investment Bank firm, and relocated to Lagos to complete his mandatory National Youth Service prior to his full engagement with the Bank. At Futureview Capital Michael worked as a core member of the Research & Strategy team, providing timely financial market research reports as well as working directly with the MD on strategies to effectively guide the firm through the Global Financial Crisis of 2008.

In 2009, Michael Ugwu started Sun Valley Farms in Sangotedo, Lagos, as a side project. By 2011, the business had grown to a 100,000-capacity fish farm and Michael became a dry/smoked fish supplier to early supermarkets such as Ebeano. It was also around this time Michael began to feel pressure from his family to get involved in Nigerian politics, prompting him to run for a seat representing Enugu at the National Assembly. Despite losing the election, Michael developed a powerful grassroots network in his Udi, Enugu constituency that would eventually form a large part of his youth activism and empowerment projects in Enugu State.

From 2010 to 2013, Michael was the CEO at iROKING, an online digital music platform focused on the Nigerian Entertainment Industry. Michael oversaw the iROKING.com content acquisition effort, signing of over 50 of Nigeria’s biggest artistes to landmark licensing deals and successfully re-negotiating subsequent deals.

He founded Freeme Digital limited in 2013 and in 2020, he became the first Nigerian to be appointed to the board of the Merlin Network. He was reappointed to the board of Merlin in January 2022.

Michael Ugwu has investments in multiple start-up companies including Shecluded, Coin Profile, Buycoins Africa, Atide Solutions and Spendify.

Honors and recognition 

 Choiseul 100 Africa 2017 
 MIPAD 100 2018
 Ranked in Billboard’s 2021 Indie Power Players

Philanthropy 
Freeme Foundation

Affa Youth Empowerment Scheme

Controversy 
Ugwu has been accused by YCEE of unethical or unfair business practices.  He was dismissed from iROKING allegedly over issues involving working with a competing service.  Ugwu has disputed iROKING's claims.

In 2020, Ugwu announced that he had been acquitted of all charges brought against him by iROKING, at the Federal High Court and Industrial Court.

Personal life
In 2019, Michael Ugwu married Onyeka Udechukwu.

References 

British music industry executives
Living people
1980 births